Devi Sri Prasad made his debut in Indian Music Industry with music album Dance Party. He composed score and soundtrack of the 1999 Telugu film Devi, making his debut in the film music industry. In his 24-year-long career, he has composed and produced film scores, soundtracks and songs for more than 100 films in various languages, predominantly in Telugu.

Original soundtracks

Original scores

As playback singer

As lyricist

Singles

Other songs

Albums

Studio albums

References

Notes

Citations

External links 

 
 Six Best Compositions of DSP on The Times of India

Discographies of Indian artists
Discography